The boys' 200 metre individual medley event at the 2018 Summer Youth Olympics took place on 8 October at the Natatorium in Buenos Aires, Argentina.

Results

Heats
The heats were started at 10:00.

Final
The final was held at 19:10.

References

Swimming at the 2018 Summer Youth Olympics